Portrait of a Man is an oil painting attributed to the Dutch painter Maarten van Heemskerck. The painting is kept in the Royal Museum of Fine Arts, Antwerp.

Painting
The man is depicted half-length, with his arms resting on a table edge, looking at the viewer head-on.

He is dressed in a sober black cloth suit. The man wears a close-fitting jerkin and a high, closed collar. Underneath, a white shirt with a frown collar is visible. The man also wears a beret.

His expression seems serious, but not quite so. The fact that the man is holding, not wearing, his gloves, which are worn when meeting important people and taken off as a gesture of courtesy and respect, enhance the man's friendliness. By holding his gloves, the man shows both respect and that he wants to be respected.

References

16th-century paintings

16th-century portraits
Paintings in the collection of the Royal Museum of Fine Arts Antwerp
Musical instruments in art
Portraits by Édouard Manet